One Voice is the debut solo album by American hard rock singer Johnny Gioeli (Hardline, Axel Rudi Pell, Crush 40). It was released on December 7, 2018 via Neapolitan label Frontiers Records  and it was produced by Italian multi-instrumentalist Alessandro Del Vecchio (Edge of Forever, Hardline, Silent Force, Jorn), also on keyboards. The entire album was written by Johnny Gioeli and guitarist Eric Gadrix. The band was completed by Italian musicians Nik Marzucconi (Edge of Forever, Labyrinth, Sunstorm) on bass and Marco Di Salvia (Edge of Forever, Hardline, Pino Scotto, Kee of Hearts).

The album was preceded by the single "Drive" on October 3, 2018.

Track listing
All songs written by Johnny Gioeli and Eric Gadrix.

Personnel

Johnny Gioeli - vocals
Eric Gadrix - guitars
Alessandro Del Vecchio - keyboards, organ, producing, recording, mixing, mastering
Nik Mazzucconi - bass guitar
Marco Di Salvia - drums

Additional personnel
Mark @ ASYLUMseventy7 - Artwork, Layout
Ash Inhester, Bjorn Carlsson, Tommaso Barletta - photography

References

2018 albums
Frontiers Records albums